Funamizu (written: 船水) is a Japanese surname. Notable people with the surname include:

, Japanese fencer
, Japanese video game designer

Japanese-language surnames